Ashton Morgan Hurn is an Australian politician. She has been a Liberal member of the South Australian House of Assembly since the 2022 state election, representing Schubert. She replaced Stephan Knoll, who had held the seat since 2014. He had beaten Hurn in party pre-selection then.

For the four years before her election, Hurn had been Director of Media and Communications for premier Steven Marshall.

Family and personal
Hurn's family has lived in the Barossa Valley region for over 170 years. Hurn is the granddaughter of Brian Hurn who had been mayor of Barossa Council for 18 years and previously played state-level cricket. She is the sister of Shannon Hurn who has played Australian Rules football for West Coast Eagles since 2006. She had also been a South Australian Institute of Sport netballer, and played in the South Australian representative 19 & Under team in 2010.

Hurn was a Barossa Young Ambassador for the 2013 Vintage Festival.

References 

Living people
Members of the South Australian House of Assembly
21st-century Australian politicians
Liberal Party of Australia members of the Parliament of South Australia
Year of birth missing (living people)
South Australian politicians
People from Angaston, South Australia